Sri Mulavarman Nala Dewa (spelled Mulawarman in Indonesian), was the king of the Kutai Martadipura Kingdom located in eastern Borneo around the year 400 CE.  What little is known of him comes from the seven Yupa inscriptions found at a sanctuary in Kutai, East Kalimantan.  He is known to have been generous to brahmins through the giving of gifts including thousands of cattle and large amounts of gold.

Reign
He was the grandson of Kudungga, and the son of Asvavarman, according to one of his inscriptions. The sanctuary bears the name of the founder of the dynasty, Vaprakesvara.

The inscriptions of Mulavarman in Brahmi script on "yūpa" sacrificial posts are the earliest known evidence of Indian influence in the Malay World, in the fourth century CE, long before the region was Indianized. The inscriptions of Mulavarman were followed about fifty years later by the inscriptions of another king, Purnavarman, in West Java.

Inscriptions

The inscriptions of Mulavarman in Brahmi script were found on "yūpa" sacrificial posts.

See also
Mulawarman University, the state-university of East Kalimantan named after the king
Kodam VI/Mulawarman, the military-district of the Indonesian Army covering East, South, and North Kalimantan named after the king

References

Year of birth missing
Year of death missing
4th-century monarchs in Asia
Hindu monarchs
Indonesian Hindu monarchs